The wines of Graves in the wine-growing region of Bordeaux were classified in 1953 by a jury appointed by Institute National des Appellations d'Origine, and approved by the Minister of Agriculture in August of that year. The selection was revised with a few additions in February 1959. The classification concerns both red and white wines, and all chateaux belong to the appellation Pessac-Léognan, which eventually came into effect on September 9, 1987.

The 1959 classification

See also
Regional wine classification
Bordeaux wine regions
History of Bordeaux wine

Notes and references

a.  Also rated as a Premier Cru in the Bordeaux Wine Official Classification of 1855.
b.  Château La Tour Haut-Brion was discontinued after the 2005 vintage.

General

 

Footnotes

External links
 Union of Classed Growths of Graves official site

Appellations
French wine
Bordeaux
Graves wine